Baburam Acharya (Nepali: बाबुराम आचार्य) (1888–1971 AD) was a Nepalese historian and literary scholar. He is known as the historian laureate of Nepal. The four part biography of King Prithivi Narayan Shah, founder of Modern Nepal is a key series of work he created. He is known for the study of ancient Nepalese inscriptions.

Sagarmatha

Nepal’s eminent historian late Baburam Acharya is credited with the Nepali name Sagarmatha for Mount Everest that straddles Nepal-China border. Previously, Nepal had no official name of its own for the world’s tallest peak in Nepali, although official name among many Nepalese people - Sherpa, Limbu, etc. existed long ago. What may not be true however is that he coined the name for the mountain.
Baburam wrote an essay in the late 1930s in which he said that among the local population of the remote Everest region the mountain was popular by the name Sagarmatha (meaning the Head of the Earth touching the Heaven); some even called it Jhomolongma. In his own words:

The then rulers of Nepal took exception of publication of the essay and its publication, and the historian was admonished. In his book A Brief Account of Nepal, Baburam wrote

In his another book China, Tibet and Nepal Baburam wrote: "The name Sagarmatha already existed; I only discovered it; it is not that I christened the mountain with a new name."

Two decades after the publication of the essay, the Nepalese government gave official recognition to the name.

Publications 

 The Bloodstained Throne: Struggles for Power in Nepal (1775-1914)
 Chin, Tibet ra Nepal
 Purana Kavi ra Kabita
 General Bhimsen Thapa: Yinko Utthan ra Patan
 Nepalko Sanskritic Parampara
 Hamro Rastrabhasa Nepali
 Shree Panch Pratapsingh Shah
 Prachinkaalko Nepal
 Nepalko Samchhipta Britanta
 Shree Panch Prithvi Narayan Shah ko Samchhipta Jeewani
 Baburam Acharya ra Unka Kriti

Recognition 
Stamp issued by the Government of Nepal 12 March 1973

Further Studies 

 Sahitya ra Srasta.

References

1888 births
1971 deaths
20th-century Nepalese historians

Khas people
Nepalese non-fiction writers